Frank J. Popper (born 1944) is a professor at the Edward J. Bloustein School of Planning and Public Policy of Rutgers University and the Princeton Environmental Institute at Princeton University, known for proposing the Buffalo Commons concept for the Great Plains region of the United States and coining the term locally unwanted land use (LULU).

Frank Popper is the son of Hans Popper, the founding father of hepatology, and Lina Popper. He is married to Deborah Popper, with whom he co-authored his greatest works on Buffalo Commons and Shrinking Cities. He has two children, Joanna Popper and Nicholas Popper.

Publications
"Siting LULUs" (1981)
"The Great Plains: From Dust to Dust" (1987), with Deborah E. Popper

External links
Frank J. Popper at Rutgers University
Frank J. Popper at Princeton University

1944 births
Living people
20th-century American Jews
American people of Austrian-Jewish descent
American urban planners
Haverford College alumni
Harvard Kennedy School alumni
Rutgers University faculty
21st-century American Jews